Steven Charles Wheelwright was the 9th president of Brigham Young University–Hawaii (BYU-Hawaii) from 2007 to 2015. Prior to that appointment, he was a professor and senior associate dean at Harvard Business School.

Biography
Wheelwright has a bachelor's degree in mathematics from the University of Utah and an MBA and Ph.D. from the Stanford Graduate School of Business.

He served as a mission president for the Church of Jesus Christ of Latter-day Saints (LDS Church) in the England London Mission from 2000 to 2003.

On May 12, 2015, it was announced that effective July 27, 2015, Wheelwright would be succeeded by John S. Tanner as the president of BYU-Hawaii.  In November 2015, he began a three-year term as president of the LDS Church's Boston Massachusetts Temple.

He is married to Margaret Steele Wheelwright. They are the parents of five children, including Marianne W. Lewis, former dean of the Cass Business School in London and current dean of the Carl H. Lindner College of Business at the University of Cincinnati.

See also 

 Hayes-Wheelwright Matrix

References

External links
Biography on BYU Hawaii web site

1943 births
20th-century Mormon missionaries
21st-century Mormon missionaries
American leaders of the Church of Jesus Christ of Latter-day Saints
American Mormon missionaries in England
Harvard Business School faculty
Living people
Mission presidents (LDS Church)
Presidents of Brigham Young University–Hawaii
Stanford Graduate School of Business alumni
University of Utah alumni
Latter Day Saints from Utah
Latter Day Saints from California
Latter Day Saints from Massachusetts
Latter Day Saints from Hawaii